Cucumis argenteus is a vine in the family Cucurbitaceae that is native to Western Australia through parts of the Pilbara and northeastern Goldfields-Esperance regions.

References

argenteus
Plants described in 2012
Flora of Western Australia